A Thousand Country Roads is a 2002 novel by Robert James Waller. It is the epilogue to The Bridges of Madison County which was published in 1992. The book was written in order to appeal to fan interest in the story of Robert Kincaid and Francesca Johnson after their four-day affair.

Plot introduction
The story relates what happened to Robert Kincaid and Francesca Johnson following their passionate and ill-fated love affair in The Bridges of Madison County. Kincaid initially finds himself with just memories of a lonely existence and of Francesca Johnson, for whom he felt a great passion. Pushed by these memories and desiring to give meaning to his life, Kincaid takes to the road again. A Thousand Country Roads explores his development as he explores himself and the world around him on his journey.

See also

Madison County, Iowa

External links
 Reading Group Guides: A Thousand Country Roads

2002 American novels
Sequel novels